Artūras Valeika (born 11 August 1985) is a Lithuanian professional basketball player for CBet Jonava of the Lithuanian Basketball League. He is 2 times champion in Romania with CSM Oradea, and one time SuperCup winner with the ”Red Lions”.

Born in Vilnius, Lithuanian SSR, Soviet Union, Valeika started his career in 2003 playing for Vilnius SSK-Nord/LB Draudimas which was playing in the second Lithuanian league LKAL. After one season he started studies at Weber State University where he also played basketball for the Wildcats from 2006 to 2008. Before that, he played for Midland JC. for two years. Valeika also played for the U20 Lithuanian National Team in 2005.

After he finished his studies, Artūras returned to Europe and joined Eisbären Bremerhaven basketball club playing in Germany.  However, there he didn't show good performance and after season Valeika headed to Latvia playing for SK Valmiera. After a good season he decided to come back and play in his homeland. However, he wasn't successful to settle in 2010-2011 club and migrated through many clubs. He started the season playing for BC Alytus, however in October he decided to leave that club and joined BC Perlas. This time he played 
there until January and then returned to SK Valmiera after one season. Still unhappy being there, he joined Spanish club Cáceres 2016, where he finished the 2010–2011 season. In summer 2011, Valeika signed a contract with Lithuanian club BC Neptūnas. After two solid seasons in BC Prienai, he signed with BC Lietuvos rytas in the summer of 2014. After a season with Rytas, he was loaned to BC Lietkabelis.

Statistics

College Statistics

References
 Artūras Valeika. Lietuvos Krepšinio Lyga (Lithuanian Basketball League). Accessed 2011-09-06.
 Eurocup Profile

1985 births
Living people
Basketball players from Vilnius
BC Lietkabelis players
BC Neptūnas players
BC Prienai players
BC Rytas players
BK Valmiera players
CSM Oradea (basketball) players
Eisbären Bremerhaven players
Lithuanian expatriate basketball people in the United States
Lithuanian men's basketball players
Midland Chaps basketball players
Power forwards (basketball)
Weber State Wildcats men's basketball players